Haden may refer to:

Places
Haden, Queensland, a town in the Toowoomba Region, Australia
Haden, Idaho, USA
Haden, Virginia, USA
Haden Hill,  West Midlands of England
Haden Hill House

Other uses
Haden (name)
Haden (mango), a mango cultivar widely cultivated in the U.S. state of Florida
Haden (motorcycle), a former motorcycle manufacturer based in the U.K.
Haden (appliances), a manufacturer of electrical appliances and kitchen wares in the U.K.

See also
Baron Haden-Guest, British peerage
Hayden (disambiguation)
Haydon (disambiguation)
Heyden (disambiguation)
Heydon (disambiguation)
Haydn (disambiguation)